Owls Head or Owl's Head may refer to:

in Canada (by province)
Owls Head, Halifax, Nova Scotia, a community in the Halifax Regional Municipality
Owls Head, Lunenburg County, Nova Scotia, an island
Mont Owl's Head, Quebec

in the United States (by state)
Owl's Head Historic District, Des Moines, Iowa
Owls Head, Maine, a town in Knox County on Penobscot Bay
Owls Head Light, at the entrance to Rockland Harbor
Owl's Head (Carroll, New Hampshire), a mountain in Coös County
Owl's Head (Franconia, New Hampshire), a mountain in Grafton County
Owls Head (Hebron, New Hampshire), a log cabin in Grafton County
Owl's Head Park, Brooklyn, New York
Owl's Head Skatepark, also known as Millennium Skate Park